A landship is a large vehicle that travels exclusively on land. Its name is meant to distinguish it from vehicles that travel through other mediums such as conventional ships, airships, and spaceships.

Military committees

Landship Committee 
The British Landship Committee formed during World War I to develop armored vehicles for use in trench warfare. The British proposed building "landships," super-heavy tanks capable of crossing the trench systems of the Western Front. The committee originated from the armored car division of the Royal Naval Air Service. It gained the notable support of Winston Churchill.

Military vehicles

Tank 
The tank was originally referred to as the landship, owing to the continuous development from the Landship Committee. The concept of a 1,000-ton armored, fighting machine on land quickly became too impractical and too costly for it to be realistically conceived. As such, the landship project proposed a smaller vehicle. The first conceptual tank prototype was for a 300-ton vehicle that would be made by suspending a "sort of Crystal Palace body" between three enormous wheels, allegedly inspired by the Great Wheel at Earls Court in London. Six of these 'Big Wheel' landships were eventually commissioned. However, even at a revised weight, 300 tons was considered impractical given the technology present, but the influence of the big wheel would persist in the "creeping grip" tracks of the first tanks, which were wrapped around the entire body of the machine.

Mark I tank  
The constant revision eventually led to the creation of the first tank. While the Mark 1 and later variations were smaller than the initial behemoths engineers envisioned, they still used naval guns, including the QF 6-pounder Hotchkiss, later shortened to the QF 6-pounder guns.

Schwerer Gustav 
Schwerer Gustav was a German super heavy railway gun developed in the late 1930s. It was the largest caliber rifled weapon ever used in combat and, in terms of overall weight, the heaviest mobile artillery piece ever built. With a length of 47.3 meters (155 feet, 2 inches), a width of 7.1 meters (23 feet, 4 inches) and a height of 11.6 meters (38 feet, 1 inch), the Schwerer Gustav weighed 1,350 tonnes. The gun's massive size required its own diesel-powered generator, a special railway track and an oversized crew of 2,750 (250 to assemble and fire the gun in 3 days and 2,500 to lay the tracks). By definition, the Schwerer Gustav would have qualified as a landship, albeit one limited to rails.

Super-heavy tank 
Super-heavy tanks are massive tanks, concepts of which led to gargantuan vehicles rivaling naval warships. Super-heavy tanks such as the British TOG2 and the Soviet T-42 were built in a similar layout as naval battleships, albeit on a smaller scale.

T-35  
The T-35 was a Soviet multi-turreted heavy tank. Nicknamed the "Land Battleship," it continues to be one of few armored historical vehicles named as such.

Landkreuzer P. 1000 Ratte 
The Landkreuzer P. 1000 Ratte was a proposed super-heavy tank from Nazi Germany. If completed, the Ratte would have been 35 meters (115 feet) long, 14 meters (46 feet) wide, and 11 meters (36 feet) high, with a weight of 1,000 tons. Moreover, its primary armament would have had 2x280mm 54.5 SK C/34 naval guns, with two MG-151/15 15-mm machine guns and eight FlaK 38 20-mm anti-aircraft guns, weighing 8.1 kg (18 pounds).

Landkreuzer P. 1500 Monster 
The Landkreuzer P. 1500 Monster was a proposed super-heavy self-propelled gun also devised by Nazi Germany. "The Monster," if built would have been larger than the Ratte, weighing at 1,500 tons.

Civilian vehicles
The vast majority of the world's largest terrestrial vehicles come from the engineering and mining sector. As their role involves the collection of vast underground resources in large bulk, their physical dimensions dramatically increased to accommodate the transferral of these materials; easily dwarfing any other ground vehicles by several orders of magnitude. These vehicles listed are:

Antarctic Snow Cruiser
An unsuccessful vehicle designed to explore Antarctica.

Bucket-wheel excavators

A large civilian mining vehicle. Their large size are compared to ocean liners on land. The Bagger 293 remains the heaviest land vehicle ever made.

Conveyor bridges
Large mining vehicles used in open-pit mining. The Overburden Conveyor Bridge F60 is considered the largest vehicle in physical dimensions of any type and has been referred to as a "lying Eiffel Tower."

Bucket chain excavators
Similar in size to bucket-wheel excavators and used in surface mining and dredging.

Dragline excavators
Massive excavators that move by "walking" on two, pneumatic feet. The Big Muskie was one of the largest terrestrial vehicles ever built.

Superheavy power shovels
Extremely large power shovels – The Captain rivaled bucket-wheel excavators and dragline excavators in sheer size.

Spreaders
Spreaders are incredibly large ground vehicles that are meant to 'spread' overburden into a neat, consistent and orderly manner. They closely resemble both a bucket-wheel excavator and a stacker in appearance. They are identifiable by their long discharge boom which can range as long as 195 meters in length.

Stackers
Stackers are mining vehicles that exclusively run on rails and are imposing in size, with some stacker-reclaimer hybrids having a boom length of 25 to 60 meters. These vehicles may resemble a spreader, however, a stacker's role is to pile bulk material onto a stockpile so that a reclaimer could collect and redistribute the materials. Stackers, therefore, often work in conjunction with reclaimers.

Reclaimers
Reclaimers are mining vehicles that, like stackers, run exclusively on rails. Reclaimers are traditionally very wide vehicles that come in various shapes and types; from bridge reclaimers to overarching portal reclaimers and the bucket-wheel reclaimers which superfluously resemble a bucket-wheel excavator in appearance. Reclaimers, as its name implies, 'reclaim' bulk material such as ores and cereals from a stockpile dumped by a stacker and are quite large, with bucket-wheel types usually having a boom length of 25 to 60 meters. As such, these two vehicles often work in conjunction with each other.

Tunnel boring machines
Large underground vehicles designed to drill and create subterranean subway transits, some of which weigh about 5,000 tons.

NASA crawler-transporter
An ultra-heavy transporter used to ferry spacecraft to the launching pad. At 2,000 tons each, they are the second largest ground vehicle that still use an internal combustion engine as its source of propulsion rather than being reliant on an external power source.

Gantry cranes and container cranes
Mobile gantry cranes and container cranes are notable for their large, imposing size and dimensions with weights varying from 900 tons up to 2000 tons. These vehicles are either driven by wheels or rails and require a small crew for their size. The largest gantry cranes such as Samson and Goliath are known to be one of the largest movable land machines in the world, with the Honghai Crane being the largest and the most powerful of its kind at 150m tall, a span of 124m and the total weight of 11,000 tons, with the strength to lift up to 22,000 tons.

Ultraheavy crawler cranes
Certain crawler cranes are known to reach gargantuan size. Whilst not the same extant as gantry or container cranes, the very largest, such as the XGC88000 crawler crane remains the largest self-propelled ground vehicle to date, beating out the crawler-transporters in both gross tonnage and sheer dimensions.

Breitspurbahn
A proposed civilian railway line envisioned by Adolf Hitler. These super enlarged transit lines would have accommodated ultra-wide trains that would be 500 meters (1,640 feet) long.

Design concepts
The Walking City – A form of drivable arcologies.

Parades and events
Barbados Landship – A Barbadian cultural tradition and event that mimics the British Navy.

Fictional examples

One of the first examples of the landship concept occurred in "The Land Ironclads." Created by science fiction author H.G. Wells, this was the most prominent and influential fictional landship, as it helped inspired the Landship Committee and, in turn, the tank and other armored fighting vehicles before World War I. 
In the Mortal Engines series, large landships called "traction cities" hunt smaller vehicles in the practicing of "Municipal Darwinism."
In Homeworld: Deserts of Kharak, literal land-bound aircraft carriers and land battleships are the primary mode of transporting firepower and air power in the largely desert terrain of the world of Kharak. 
In Warhammer 40,000, large land battleships, including the Capitol Imperialis and the Colossus, battle giant mechs known as Titans.
The Halo franchise used large, terrestrial vehicles, including the Mammoth and the Elephant, as troop transports. The Covenant use even larger vehicles, such as the Harvester, the Kraken and the Draugr.
In Haze, the main base of operations for the protagonist is a large, mobile terrestrial aircraft carrier.
 In Star Wars, the Jawas use the Sandcrawlers as a mobile base of operations.
In the Fallout universe, the Enclave faction used a modified crawler-transporter as a mobile base of operations.
The Dystopian Wars wargame and miniature series is set in an alternate history where steampunk technology has advanced to the point that almost every major nation has access to functional landships.

See also

Seaship – Seacraft simply known as a ship, large waterborne vessels used for commerce, maritime trade, and naval expeditions.
Airship – Large aircraft that are the airborne equivalent of naval vessels, mostly used for weather and scientific research purposes.
Spacecraft – Large vehicles used to transport objects into space, which can be split into expandable rockets or reusable spaceplanes.
Landship Committee
Road train
Armoured train
Super-heavy tank
Tsar tank
List of largest machines

References

Engineering vehicles
 
Off-road vehicles